24-26 Low Pavement are a pair of Grade II* listed buildings on Low Pavement, Nottingham.

History

The houses were built for Francis Gawthern in 1733 who built them on the site of Vault Hall, a former mansion house of the Plumptre family. Francis moved into number 26 in 1734. The gates and railings on the forecourt were also erected at the same time and are separately Grade II* listed 

In 1783 number 26 was occupied by Francis Gawthern’s great-nephew, also called Francis who married Abigail Frost in 1783. Abigail Gawthern lived until 1822 and her diary survived which is a remarkable record of the history of Nottingham from 1751 until 1810. Number 26 became known as Gawthern House. In her diary for 21 August 1798 she records that her visitors were Lord Byron, the two Miss Parkyns (of Bunny Hall), and the two Master Smiths from Wilford Hall. Abigail was buried in St Mary's Church, Nottingham where her memorial slab was discovered in 2012 during the restoration of the church floor.

References

Grade II* listed buildings in Nottinghamshire
Buildings and structures in Nottingham
Buildings and structures completed in 1734